The following is a list of all 42 (35 on-disc and 7 DLC) songs available for the Lips spin-off, Lips: Canta en Español. As with the first Lips game and Lips: Number One Hits, all songs are master tracks.

On-disc songs

Song packs
The following song packs are available for download.

 Available via a redemption code found in copies of Lips: Canta en Español.

Downloadable content

The following songs are available as DLC. These are only available in Spain and Mexico.

References

External links 
 Lips – Official site.

Lips (video game)
Lists of songs in music video games